The Primetime Emmy Award for Outstanding Comedy Series is an annual award given to the best television comedy series of the year. From 1960 to 1964, this category was combined with the Comedy Specials (one time programs) category so that both type of programs competed for the same award during those years. The award goes to the producers of the series.

Milestones
The Flintstones and Family Guy are the only animated sitcoms to be nominated for the award. As of 2020, Fleabag (United Kingdom)  and Schitt's Creek (Canada) are the only shows from outside the United States to win this award.

The Big Three networks (ABC, CBS and NBC) have dominated the category. Only six other networks have won the award: HBO (once with Sex and the City and three times with Veep) four times, Fox (with Ally McBeal and Arrested Development) and Apple TV+ (with Ted Lasso) twice, and Amazon Prime Video (with The Marvelous Mrs. Maisel), the BBC (with Fleabag; although seen later on Prime Video), and Pop TV (with Schitt's Creek; originally seen on CBC Television) once.

Winners and nominations
The following tables, divided by decade, show the winners listed first in colored row, followed by the other nominees of the "Comedy Series" award, according to the Primetime Emmy Awards database:

1950s

1960s

1970s

1980s

1990s

2000s

2010s

2020s

Programs with multiple wins

5 wins
 Frasier (consecutive)
 Modern Family (consecutive)

4 wins
 All in the Family (3 consecutive)
 Cheers (2 consecutive)

3 wins
 The Dick Van Dyke Show (consecutive)
 The Mary Tyler Moore Show (consecutive)
 The Phil Silvers Show (consecutive)
 Taxi (consecutive)
 30 Rock (consecutive)
 Veep (consecutive)

2 wins
 Everybody Loves Raymond
 Get Smart (consecutive)
 The Golden Girls (consecutive)
 I Love Lucy (consecutive)
 The Jack Benny Program
 Murphy Brown
 Ted Lasso (consecutive)

Programs with multiple nominations

11 nominations
 Cheers
 M*A*S*H

10 nominations
 Curb Your Enthusiasm

9 nominations
 All in the Family

8 nominations
 Frasier
 Modern Family

7 nominations
 Barney Miller
 Everybody Loves Raymond
 The Mary Tyler Moore Show
 Seinfeld
 30 Rock
 Veep

6 nominations
 Friends
 The Golden Girls
 The Jack Benny Program
 The Larry Sanders Show
 The Office
 Sex and the City
 Will & Grace

5 nominations
 Murphy Brown
 Silicon Valley
 Taxi

4 nominations
 Bewitched
 The Big Bang Theory
 Black-ish
 The Dick Van Dyke Show
 Family Ties
 Father Knows Best
 The George Burns and Gracie Allen Show
 Get Smart
 I Love Lucy
 Mad About You
 The Marvelous Mrs. Maisel
 The Phil Silvers Show
 The Red Skelton Show
 Unbreakable Kimmy Schmidt
 The Wonder Years

3 nominations
 The Andy Griffith Show
 Arrested Development
 Barry
 The Bob Cummings Show
 Caesar's Hour
 The Cosby Show
 Designing Women
 Entourage
 Hogan's Heroes
 Home Improvement
 Kate & Allie
 Louie
 Mister Peepers
 Night Court
 The Odd Couple
 Our Miss Brooks
 Soap
 Two and a Half Men
 WKRP in Cincinnati

2 nominations
 Ally McBeal
 Atlanta
 Buffalo Bill
 The Danny Thomas Show
 Family Affair
 Girls
 Glee
 The Good Place
 Hacks
 The Kominsky Method
 Love, American Style
 Make Room for Daddy
 Master of None
 McHale's Navy
 Newhart
 Parks and Recreation
 Sanford and Son
 Schitt's Creek
 Scrubs
 Ted Lasso
 3rd Rock from the Sun
 Transparent
 What We Do in the Shadows

Total awards by network

 NBC – 26
 CBS – 22
 ABC – 11
 HBO – 4

 Apple TV+ – 2
 Fox – 2
 Prime Video – 2
 Pop TV – 1

Notes

See also
 Primetime Emmy Award for Outstanding Drama Series
 Golden Globe Award for Best Television Series – Musical or Comedy
 Screen Actors Guild Award for Outstanding Performance by an Ensemble in a Comedy Series
 Critics' Choice Television Award for Best Comedy Series

References

External links
 Primetime Emmy® Awards
 Emmy Awards coverage on DigitalHit.com
 Primetime Emmy® Awards Historical Database
 Emmy Awards Online with Emmy news, nominees and winners

Comedy Series
 

fr:Emmy du meilleur scénario pour une émission de variétés, musicale ou comique